László Sternberg (28 May 1905 – 4 July 1982) was a Hungarian footballer who played professionally in both Europe and the United States. A defender, he captained the Hungarian national football team at the 1934 FIFA World Cup.

In 1925, Sternberg began his career with Novese Novi Ligure.  After one season, he moved to Andrea Doria  In 1927, a new law in Italy banned the use of foreign players on Italian teams.  Sternberg returned to Hungary and joined Újpest FC.  In 1928, Sternberg moved to the United States and signed with the New York Giants of the American Soccer League.  With the outbreak of the "Soccer Wars" between the ASL and the United States Football Federation, Sternberg briefly played in the Eastern Professional Soccer League.  In 1929, he moved to Brooklyn Hakoah, a predominantly Jewish team.  In 1930, Brooklyn merged with New York Hakoah to form the Hakoah All-Stars.  Brooklyn Hakoah won the 1929 National Challenge Cup.  In 1932, he briefly played for the New York Americans.  He then he returned to Europe and joined Újpest FC before finishing his career with Red Star Paris. He gained nineteen caps as a defender for Hungary.

He went on to coach Újpest FC from 1937 to 1938.

References

External links
 
 

1905 births
1982 deaths
Association football defenders
American Soccer League (1921–1933) players
Eastern Professional Soccer League (1928–29) players
Expatriate footballers in France
Hakoah All-Stars players
Hungarian footballers
Hungarian football managers
Hungary international footballers
Hungarian expatriate footballers
Ligue 1 players
New York Americans (soccer) (1930–1933) players
New York Giants (soccer) players
Red Star F.C. players
Újpest FC players
Újpest FC managers
1934 FIFA World Cup players
Hungarian expatriate sportspeople in France
Hungarian expatriate sportspeople in the United States
Expatriate soccer players in the United States
Expatriate footballers in Italy
Hungarian expatriate sportspeople in Italy